This article contains the individual statistics of players in the FIBA EuroChallenge competition. The FIBA EuroChallenge was the 3rd-tier level European-wide professional basketball league. The league is now defunct.

Statistical leaders

Points

Rebounds

Assists

Steals

Blocks

Individual highs

Statistical top 10s

2003–04 FIBA Europe League

Points per game:

 Duane Woodward (EKA AEL Limassol): 21.3
 Dametri Hill (Skonto Riga): 20.2
 Ashante Johnson (ECM Nymburk): 19.5
 Nestoras Kommatos (Aris Thessaloniki): 18.8
 Andris Biedriņš (Skonto Riga): 18.6
 George Zidek (ECM Nymburk): 18
 Nebojša Bogavac (Hemofarm Vršac): 17.7
 Nenad Čanak (NIS Vojvodina Novi Sad): 17.6
 Steve Goodrich (BC Kyiv): 17.2
 Troy Coleman (Kalev Tallinn): 16.8
 Milan Gurović (NIS Vojvodina Novi Sad): 16.76
 Jason Sasser (GHP Bamberg): 16.71

Assists per game:

 Stevin Smith (Strauss Iscar Nahariya): 6.8
 Randolph Childress (SLUC Nancy): 5.4
 Maurice Whitfield (ECM Nymburk): 5.4
 Petr Samoylenko (UNICS Kazan): 5.1
 Vidas Ginevičius (Alita Alytus): 4.5
 Roderick Blakney (Maroussi Telestet Athens): 4.4
 Vassilis Spanoulis (Maroussi Telestet Athens): 4.28
 Zakhar Pashutin (Ural Great Perm): 4.2
 John Celestand (BC Kyiv): 4.0
 Armands Šķēle (Anwil Włocławek): 4
 Denis Mujagic (ECM Nymburk): 3.857
 Dror Hajaj (Hapoel Tel Aviv): 3.85

Rebounds per game:

 Chris Ensminger (GHP Bamberg): 12.5
 Christophe Beghin (Telindus Oostende): 8.3
 Andris Biedriņš (Skonto Riga): 8.18
 Kšyštof Lavrinovič (Ural Great Perm): 8.13
 JoJo Garcia (SLUC Nancy): 7.9
 Steven Goodrich (BC Kyiv): 7.3
 Stanislav Balashov (BC Kyiv): 7.2
 Andrej Botichev (Azovmash Mariupol): 7.07
 Eric Campbell (Strauss Iscar Nahariya): 7.05
 Joey Beard (Telindus Oostende): 6.8
 Grigorij Khizhnyak (GS Peristeri Athens): 6.5
 Gennadiy Kuznyetsov (MBC Odessa): 6.3

Steals per game:

 Vidas Ginevičius (Alita Alytus): 2.9
 Denis Mujagic (ECM Nymburk): 2.7
 Stevin Smith (Strauss Iscar Nahariya): 2.58
 Bekir Yarangüme (Turk Telekom Ankara): 2.57
 Duane Woodward (EKA AEL Limassol): 2.4
 Roderick Blakney (Maroussi Telestet Athens): 2.3

Blocks per game:

 Grigorij Khizhnyak (GS Peristeri Athens): 2.5
 Vincent Jones (Ural Great Perm): 2.2
 Andris Biedriņš (Skonto Riga): 1.8
 Kšyštof Lavrinovič (Ural Great Perm): 1.7
 Janar Talts (Kalev Tallinn): 1.53
 Denis Ershov (Khimki Moscow): 1.5

2004–05 FIBA Europe League

Points per game:

 Alvin Young (Bnei Hasharon): 22.6
 Art Long (Azovmash Mariupol): 21.3
 Shammond Williams (UNICS Kazan): 21.1
 Christian Dalmau (Hapoel Galil Elyon): 20.41
 Khalid El-Amin (Beşiktaş Istanbul): 20.4
 Sam Hoskin (Ural Great Perm): 20.2
 Aleksandar Zečević (RBC Verviers-Pepinster): 20
 Kelly McCarty (Dynamo St.Petersburg): 19.4
 Damir Mršić (Fenerbahçe Istanbul): 19.36
 Kelvin Gibbs (Hapoel Tel Aviv): 19.33
 Lior Eliyahu (Hapoel Galil Elyon): 19.0
 Sharon Shason (Ural Great Perm): 19.0

Assists per game:

 Khalid El-Amin (Beşiktaş Istanbul): 7.1
 Maurice Whitfield (CEZ Nymburk): 6.1
 Ed Cota (Dynamo St.Petersburg): 6.0
 Curtis McCants (Hapoel Tel Aviv): 5.6
 Damir Mršić (Fenerbahçe Istanbul): 5.5
 Shammond Williams (UNICS Kazan): 5.4
 Lior Lubin (Azovmash Mariupol): 4.84
 Gordan Firić (BS|Energy Braunschweig): 4.81
 Hakan Köseoğlu (Tuborg Pilsener İzmir): 4.6
 Eric Micoud (JDA Dijon): 4.6
 Melvin Booker (Khimki Moscow): 4.21
 Asım Pars (Tuborg Pilsener İzmir): 4.2

Rebounds per game:

 Art Long (Azovmash Mariupol): 11.8
 Aerick Sanders (Tuborg Pilsener İzmir): 10.0
 Sam Hoskin (Ural Great Perm): 9.0
 Chris Booker (Fenerbahçe Istanbul): 8.58
 Joe Spinks (Demon Astronauts Amsterdam): 8.57
 James Potter (Dexia Mons-Hainaut): 8.2
 Marc Salyers (Fenerbahçe Istanbul): 8.1
 Luc-Arthur Vebobe (Paris Basket Racing): 8
 Marcus Douthit (RBC Verviers-Pepinster): 8
 Alex Jensen (Tuborg Pilsener İzmir): 7.9
 Boniface N'Dong (JDA Dijon): 7.8
 Travon Bryant (Iraklis Thessaloniki): 7.7

Steals per game:

 Alvin Young (Bnei Hasharon): 3.1
 Joe Spinks (Demon Astronauts Amsterdam): 2.7
 Khalid El-Amin (Beşiktaş Istanbul): 2.6
 Justin Hamilton (Iraklis Thessaloniki): 2.4
 Maurice Whitfield (CEZ Nymburk): 2.21
 Kelvin Gibbs (Hapoel Tel Aviv): 2.2

Blocks per game:

 Toni Simik (Fersped Rabotnicki Skopje): 2
 Nedžad Sinanović (RBC Verviers-Pepinster): 1.8
 Marcus Douthit (RBC Verviers-Pepinster): 1.8
 Art Long (Azovmash Mariupol): 1.6
 Denis Ershov (Khimki Moscow): 1.52
 Eric Campbell (Strauss Iscar Nahariya): 1.5

2005–06 FIBA EuroCup

Points per game:

 Khalid El-Amin (Azovmash Mariupol): 19.7
 Damir Mršić (Fenerbahçe Istanbul): 19.6
 Kaspars Kambala (Fenerbahçe Istanbul): 17.3
 Nikita Morgunov (Dynamo Moscow Region): 17.1
 Jaime Lloreda (Lokomotiv Rostov): 16.8
 Todor Gečevski (KK Zadar): 16.1
 Radoslav Rančík (CEZ Nymburk): 15.9
 Kevin Houston (Dexia Mons-Hainaut): 15.55
 Roderick Blakney (Maroussi Honda Athens): 15.54
 Jarod Stevenson (Fenerbahçe Istanbul): 15.2
 Adam Hess (CEZ Nymburk): 15.0
 Frankie King (Privatbank EKA AEL Limassol): 14.9

Assists per game:

 Maurice Whitfield (CEZ Nymburk): 5.8
 Elmer Bennett (DKV Joventut Badalona): 5.46
 Stevin Smith (Dynamo Moscow Region): 5.41
 Igor Miličić (Dexia Mons-Hainaut): 4.4
 Ognjen Aškrabić (Dynamo St.Petersburg): 3.9
 Jerry McCullough (Dynamo St.Petersburg): 3.75
 Immanuel McElroy (RheinEnergie Cologne): 3.73
 Khalid El-Amin (Azovmash Mariupol): 3.58
 Damir Mršić (Fenerbahçe Istanbul): 3.58
 Mark Dickel (Lokomotiv Rostov): 3.57
 Melvin Booker (Khimki Moscow): 3.47
 Gianmarco Pozzecco (Khimki Moscow): 3.4

Rebounds per game:

 Jaime Lloreda (Lokomotiv Rostov): 11.5
 Kebu Stewart (Vertical Vision Cantù): 10.4
 Adam Hess (CEZ Nymburk): 7.8
 Todor Gečevski (KK Zadar): 7.5
 Kevin Fletcher (Śląsk Wrocław): 7.4
 Kevin Houston (Dexia Mons-Hainaut): 7.3
 George Evans (Dexia Mons-Hainaut): 7.1
 Rubén Wolkowyski (Khimki Moscow): 6.8
 Cory Violette (Fenerbahçe Istanbul): 6.7
 Immanuel McElroy (RheinEnergie Cologne): 6.66
 Óscar Torres (Khimki Moscow): 6.64
 Nikita Morgunov (Dynamo Moscow Region): 6.5

Steals per game:

 Stevin Smith (Dynamo Moscow Region): 2.25
 George Evans (Dexia Mons-Hainaut): 2.21
 Dean Oliver (KK Zadar): 2.1
 Roderick Blakney (Maroussi Honda Athens): 2
 Radoslav Rančík (CEZ Nymburk): 2
 Lior Lubin (Azovmash Mariupol): 1.8

Blocks per game:

 Serhiy Lishchuk (Azovmash Mariupol): 1.25
 Marcin Gortat (RheinEnergie Cologne): 1.2
 Rubén Wolkowyski (Khimki Moscow): 1.1
 Kevin Fletcher (Śląsk Wrocław): 1.0
 Jaime Lloreda (Lokomotiv Rostov): 0.92
 Nikita Morgunov (Dynamo Moscow Region): 0.91

2006–07 FIBA EuroCup

Points per game:

 Erwin Dudley (Turk Telekom Ankara): 21.4
 Travis Reed (Kalev/Cramo Tallinn): 19.8
 Karim Souchu (Liege Basket): 18.1
 Anthony Lux (JDA Dijon): 17.2
 Sandis Valters (ASK Riga): 16.8
 Arvydas Cepulis (KK Šiauliai): 16
 Curtis Millage (ASK Riga): 15.8
 Maleye Ndoye (JDA Dijon): 15.4
 Roger Huggins (Liege Basket): 15
 Andre Hutson (Panionios Athens): 14.8
 Cătălin Burlacu (Kalev/Cramo Tallinn): 14.7
 Will McDonald (MMT Estudiantes Madrid): 14.5

Assists per game:

 Laurent Sciarra (JDA Dijon): 8.9
 Tutku Açık (Turk Telekom Ankara): 5.1
 Travis Best (Virtus Europonteggi Bologna): 4.3
 Andrius Mažutis (KK Šiauliai): 4.1
 Khalid El-Amin (Azovmash Mariupol): 3.9
 Javier Mendiburu (MMT Estudiantes Madrid): 3.8
 Milutin Aleksić (DTL-EKA AEL Limassol): 3.3
 Roderick Blakney (Dynamo Moscow Region): 3.28
 Curtis Millage (ASK Riga): 3.22
 Ariel McDonald (Akasvayu Girona): 3.12
 Vlado Ilievski (Virtus Europonteggi Bologna): 3.1
 Haluk Yıldırım (Turk Telekom Ankara): 3
 Sandis Buškevics (ASK Riga): 3

Rebounds per game:

 Tadas Klimavičius (KK Šiauliai): 9
 Serhiy Lishchuk (Azovmash Mariupol): 8.17
 Josh Davis (Dynamo Moscow Region): 8.1
 Andre Hutson (Panionios Athens): 7.7
 Roger Huggins (Liege Basket): 7.6
 Cătălin Burlacu (Kalev/Cramo Tallinn): 7.5
 Travis Reed (Kalev/Cramo Tallinn): 7.3
 Anthony Lux (JDA Dijon): 7.1
 Erwin Dudley (Turk Telekom Ankara): 6.7
 Krešimir Lončar (Lokomotiv Rostov): 6.4
 Fedor Likholitov (Dynamo Moscow Region): 6.28
 Kenan Bajramović (Azovmash Mariupol): 6.23

Steals per game:

 Laurent Sciarra (JDA Dijon): 3
 Roderick Blakney (Dynamo Moscow Region): 2.3
 Curtis Millage (ASK Riga): 2.11
 Roger Huggins (Liege Basket): 2.1
 Andrius Mažutis (KK Šiauliai): 2.0
 Panagiotis Kafkis (Panionios Athens): 1.9

Blocks per game:

 Serhiy Lishchuk (Azovmash Mariupol): 2.0
 Derrick Alston (Turk Telekom Ankara): 1.2
 Remon van de Hare (DTL-EKA AEL Limassol): 1.0
 Artūras Masiulis (KK Šiauliai): 1.0
 Fedor Likholitov (Dynamo Moscow Region): 1
 Tadas Klimavičius (KK Šiauliai): 1

2007–08 FIBA EuroCup

Points per game:

 Adrian Henning (Lappeenrannan NMKY): 20.6
 Nando de Colo (Cholet Basket): 19.2
 Alex Scales (CSK VVS Samara): 17.4
 Joseph Smith (Spartak St. Petersburg): 17.3
 Milutin Aleksić (Proteas EKA AEL Limassol): 16.8
 Petri Virtanen (Lappeenrannan NMKY): 16.2
 Andrew Adeleke (Banvit Bandırma): 15.7
 Demetrius Alexander (Barons/LMT Riga): 15.6
 Sasa Bratic (Khimik Yuzhniy): 15.3
 Vanja Plisnić (Ural Great Perm): 15.3
 Claude Marquis (Cholet Basket): 15.12
 Marque Perry (CSK VVS Samara): 15.1

Assists per game:

 Jakov Vladović (KK Zagreb): 6.8
 Giorgi Tsintsadze (Tartu Rock): 5.2
 Travis Conlan (Dexia Mons-Hainaut): 4.5
 Petri Virtanen (Lappeenrannan NMKY): 4.37
 Rolandas Jarutis (Cherkaski Mavpy): 4.37
 Andrew Wisniewski (Ural Great Perm): 4.3
 Tanel Tein (Tartu Rock): 4.1
 Milutin Aleksić (Proteas EKA AEL Limassol): 4.0
 Juha Sten (Lappeenrannan NMKY): 3.8
 Duane Woodward (Proteas EKA AEL Limassol): 3.6
 Wykeen Kelly (Khimik Yuzhniy): 3.5
 Armands Šķēle (Barons/LMT Riga): 3.0

Rebounds per game:

 Andrew Adeleke (Banvit Bandırma): 11
 Yaniv Green (CSK VVS Samara): 8.4
 Aki Ulander (Lappeenrannan NMKY): 8.14
 Claude Marquis (Cholet Basket): 8.12
 Ante Tomić (KK Zagreb): 7.6
 Demetrius Alexander (Barons/LMT Riga): 7.5
 Brian Cusworth (Tartu Rock): 7.2
 Adrian Henning (Lappeenrannan NMKY): 7.1
 Janar Talts (Tartu Rock): 6.92
 Milutin Aleksić (Proteas EKA AEL Limassol): 6.90
 Damir Markota (Spartak St.Petersburg): 6.7
 Maxime Zianveni (Proteas EKA AEL): 6.4

Steals per game:

 Travis Conlan (Dexia Mons-Hainaut): 2.5
 Evgeni Voronov (CSK VVS Samara): 2.2
 Alex Scales (CSK VVS Samara): 2.1
 Steed Tchicamboud (Cholet Basket): 2
 Derya Yannier (Banvit Bandırma): 1.8
 Giorgi Tsintsadze (Tartu Rock): 1.7
 Armands Šķēle (Barons/LMT Riga): 1.7

Blocks per game:

 Janar Talts (Tartu Rock): 1.53
 John Edwards (Cherkaski Mavpy): 1.5
 Yaniv Green (CSK VVS Samara): 1.4
 Brian Cusworth (Tartu Rock): 1.1
 Andriy Agafonov (Khimik Yuzhniy): 1
 Adrian Henning (Lappeenrannan NMKY): 1

FIBA EuroChallenge
Basketball statistics